Cuckoo in the Clock is a song with lyrics written by Johnny Mercer, and music composed by Walter Donaldson.

A popular version of Cuckoo in the Clock was recorded in 1939 by Kay Kyser & His Orchestra (vocals by Sully Mason) for Brunswick Records (catalog No. 8312).

Other versions
 Mildred Bailey with Red Norvo & His Orchestra, recorded February 8, 1939 for Conqueror Records.
 Benny Goodman - vocal by Johnny Mercer, recorded February 1, 1939 for Victor Records.
 Lena Horne – Lena Like Latin (1963).
 Glenn Miller & His Orchestra – vocal by Marion Hutton, recorded February 6, 1939 for Bluebird Records.
 Toots Thielemans – Time Out for Toots (1958).
 Mel Torme – released on EP in 1956.

References

Songs about birds
1939 songs
Songs with music by Walter Donaldson
Songs with lyrics by Johnny Mercer
Benny Goodman songs
Mildred Bailey songs
Lena Horne songs